Sheldon may refer to:

 Sheldon (name), a given name and a surname, and a list of people with the name

Places

Australia
Sheldon, Queensland
Sheldon Forest, New South Wales

United Kingdom
Sheldon, Derbyshire, England
Sheldon, Devon, England
Sheldon, West Midlands, England
Sheldon Stone Circle, Aberdeenshire, Scotland
Sheldon Manor, Chippenham, Wiltshire

United States
 Sheldon, Illinois
 Sheldon, Iowa
 Sheldon, Minnesota
 Sheldon, Missouri
 Sheldon, New York
 Sheldon, North Dakota
 Sheldon, South Carolina
 Sheldon, Texas
 Sheldon, Vermont
 Sheldon, Monroe County, Wisconsin
 Sheldon, Rusk County, Wisconsin

Other uses

 Sheldon coin grading scale
 Sheldon School, Chippenham, Wiltshire, England
 Sheldon High School, several schools
 The Sheldon, concert hall and art galleries in St. Louis, Missouri
 Sheldon (webcomic), created by Dave Kellett
 Young Sheldon, created by Chuck Lorre and Steven Molaro
 Sheldon, a character from the video game Splatoon

See also 
Shelton (disambiguation)
Shelldon, an animated television series